Dead Men Tell No Tales is a 1920 American silent adventure film directed by Tom Terriss and starring Catherine Calvert. It was produced by Terriss and the Vitagraph Company of America with distribution by Vitagraph.

Cast

Preservation
With no prints of Dead Men Tell No Tales located in any film archives, it is a lost film.

References

External links

Lantern slide at silenthollywood.com

1920 films
American silent feature films
American black-and-white films
Lost American films
Films directed by Tom Terriss
Vitagraph Studios films
American adventure films
1920 adventure films
1920s American films
Silent adventure films